The Madsen is a light machine gun that Julius A. Rasmussen and Theodor Schouboe designed and proposed for adoption by Colonel Vilhelm Herman Oluf Madsen, the Danish Minister of War, and that the Royal Danish Army adopted in 1902. It was the world's first true light machine gun produced in quantity and Madsen was able to sell it in 12 calibres to over 34 countries. The gun saw extensive combat usage for over 100 years, with continued use in limited quantities worldwide into the 2010s. The Madsen was produced by Compagnie Madsen A/S (later operating as Dansk Rekyl Riffel Syndikat A/S and then Dansk Industri Syndikat A/S).

Design details

The design dates to 1880s, with the Danish Self Loading rifle M.1888, being a precursor design. In 1883 Captain Vilhelm Herman Oluf Madsen (a Danish artillery officer), and Rustmester Rasmussen (a weapons technician at the Danish Arsenal), began working on a recoil-operated self-loading rifle; Madsen developed the idea and Rasmussen fabricated the actual weapons. The rifle used a non-removable stripper clip that used gravity to feed rounds to the action; when the gun was not in use one could fold the clip down to cover the opening. The rifle used the 8×58RD cartridge, first in black-powder and then in a much more powerful smokeless powder version. The design was not successful. An improved design in 1896 gave the rifle an enclosed, but still gravity-fed, magazine. This version saw some 50–60 rifles being produced, but they were only issued to the Danish navy for use by coastal fortifications troops.

Investors formed a company (the Dansk Riffel Syndikat; DRS), in 1898 to commercialise the rifle, and bought the patent rights from Madsen and Rasmussen in exchange for royalties on future production. By this time Madsen had left the project to become Minister of War in Denmark. In 1899 Lieutenant Jens Schouboe became the manager for the DRS, and a number of subsequent patents bear his name. Consequently, the Madsen rifle is sometimes referred to as the Schouboe rifle. In 1901 he patented the design for the Madsen machine gun. The original Madsen machine guns used black-powder cartridges that quickly jammed the action. However, once the design was tried with 6.5mm smokeless powder rounds it worked well.

The Madsen has a rather sophisticated and unique operating cycle. The machine gun uses a mixed recoil-operated locking system with a hinged bolt that is patterned after the lever-action Peabody Martini breechblock. The recoil operation is part short and part long recoil. After firing a round to start the open bolt firing cycle, the initial recoil impulse drives the barrel, barrel extension, and bolt to the rear. A pin on the right side of the bolt moves backward in grooves in an operating cam plate mounted to the right side of the receiver. After  of travel, the bolt is cammed upward, away from the breech (the "short" portion of the recoil system). The barrel and barrel extension continue to move rearward to a point slightly exceeding the combined overall length of the cartridge case and projectile (the long portion of the recoil system, responsible for the weapon's low rate of fire).

After the breech is exposed, an odd lever-type extractor/ejector, mounted under the barrel, pivots to the rear, extracts the empty case, and ejects it through the bottom of the receiver. The bolt's operating cam then forces the bolt face to pivot downward, aligning a cartridge feed groove in the left side of the bolt with the chamber. While the bolt and barrel are returning forward, a cartridge-rammer lever, mounted on the barrel extension, pivots forward, loading a fresh cartridge.

Operational use

Up to and including World War I
The Madsen was considered expensive to produce, but was known for its reliability. Thirty-four countries bought the gun, in a dozen different calibres, before and after World War I. They were used by all sides in the Mexican Revolution.

In Britain, the Rexer Arms Company manufactured the Madsen without license from 1905. The guns were known as the Rexer or DDRS and exported worldwide.

The Imperial Russian Army bought 1,250 Madsens for the cavalry and deployed them during the Russo-Japanese War. The Imperial Russian Air Service used Madsens to equip their Morane-Saulnier G and Morane-Saulnier L monoplanes, and as its open bolt firing cycle made it difficult to fire through a propeller, the Madsen's gun mounting had to fire over the propeller. The German Army deployed the Madsen in 7.92 mm calibre in 1914, arming infantry companies, mountain troops and later storm troopers.

China would acquire about 150 Madsens by 1913, and begin manufacturing a domestic copy at Guangdong Arsenal in 1909.

Inter-war era

Among the fighting forces with the Madsen in their arsenals in the immediate aftermath of World War I were the Czechoslovak Legions in Russia, fighting the Bolsheviks in Siberia. The Madsen also saw service in China during the Warlord era. By 1935, China would acquire roughly 300 Madsen machine guns, with under 100 of these being used for Malmö Flygindustri, SIAI, and Caproni aircraft.

Paraguay bought the Madsen in the 1920s and early 1930s as that country quietly girded for war with Bolivia over mutual claims to the Gran Chaco region, and it served in the Paraguayan army in the Chaco War (1932–1935). Almost 400 were on hand when the war began, and the Paraguayans bought more as the war progressed. Bolivia also fielded Madsens of the same calibre as Paraguay (7.65×53 Mauser) during the conflict.

The Argentine Army detachment that protected neutrality along the border with Paraguay and Bolivia during the Chaco War used the Madsen in combat operations at least once in 1933 in the course of an engagement on the southern bank of the Pilcomayo river against members of the Maká tribe commanded by deserters who had looted a farm in Argentine soil, killing some of its inhabitants.

Brazil first acquired Madsen machine gun prior to the war. When Brazil acquired some 23 CV-35 tankettes from Italy in the late 1930s, it armed a majority of the vehicles with twin-mounted 7 mm Madsens. In 1943, the Army planned to produce their own Madsen machine guns at the Laminação Nacional de Metais factory.

It was standard equipment (in 6.5 mm) with the Royal Netherlands East Indies Army (KNIL) during the inter-war period until 1942. The Imperial Japanese Army used some after capturing them during the Dutch East Indies Campaign.

World War II
In China, 3,300 Madsens were ordered by March 1940 for use in the Second Sino-Japanese War.

Madsen machine guns were still in use in April–June 1940 as the Norwegian Army's standard light machine gun in the Norwegian Campaign, 3,500 M/22s in 6.5×55 Krag being available for the defence of Norway. By 1940 each Norwegian infantry squad had one Madsen machine gun, the Norwegians having previously grouped their Madsen in separate machine gun squads. Each Norwegian infantry battalion had a standard complement of 36 Madsens, in addition to nine M/29 heavy machine guns. However, many Norwegian soldiers did not like the Madsen as it had a tendency to jam after only a few rounds in this calibre, leading to it gaining the nickname . The Germans used captured Madsens for second line units throughout the war, and Danish production continued for the German armed forces in the 8×58mmR Danish Krag calibre until 1942. The Danish Army did not retire their last Madsen until 1955.

Post-war
Ireland had a total of 24 Madsen machine guns, all in .303 calibre. They armed the Irish army's Landsverk L60 light tanks, Leyland Armoured Cars, Landsverk L180 armoured cars, and Dodge Armoured Cars. In the 1950s .30 Browning machine guns replaced the Madsens still in Irish service.

Portuguese Colonial War

The Portuguese Army used Madsen machine guns during the Portuguese Colonial War of the 1960s and 1970s. Madsens served as temporary armament for Auto-Metralhadora-Daimler 4 × 4 Mod.F/64 armoured cars, which were Daimler Dingos modified with the addition of a turret-like structure.

Continued use in Brazil
The Brazilian Military Police of Rio de Janeiro State used Madsens into the 21st Century. Although some of the Brazilian guns were captured from drug traffickers and pressed into service, the majority of the Brazilian police Madsens came from the Brazilian Army; in the 1930s they were commonly used in the wars against banditry in Northeast (bandit groups named cangaceiros); these guns were originally 7x57mm Spanish Mauser weapons, later re-chambered to fit 7.62 mm NATO. Official sources state that the Brazilian army retired the Madsen machine gun in 1996. It was reported that plans were in place to retire the last Madsen guns in service with the Civil Police of Rio de Janeiro State starting in 2008. As of 2018, the Madsen was still used by the police. It was favored by police for its reliability and intimidating sound.

Users

 : Models of 1910, 1925, 1926, 1931 and 1935, mostly in 7.65×53mm Mauser
 
 :632 bought from Denmark in 1914
 : Model of 1925 in 7.65 Mauser
 : Models of 1908, 1913, 1916, 1925, 1928, 1932, 1934, 1935 and 1936, in 7×57mm Mauser and Model 1946 in .30-06
 : Models of 1915 and 1927 in 8×50mmR Mannlicher
 
 : M1922 and M1923, in 7.92 Mauser
 Czechoslovak Legions
 : Models of 1923, 1925, 1926, 1928 and 1940, most in 7mm Mauser. Model 1946 in caliber .30-06
 : Madsen M1916, Rexer, M1930 and M1937 variants, all in 7.92 Mauser
 : M1904
 : M1904, M1916, M1919, M1924, M1939 in 8×58mmR and M1948 in .30-06
 : M1934 in 7mm Mauser and M1951 in .30-06
 : M1925 and M1937 in .303 British Bought Finnish surplus Madsens in 1937
 : M1907, M1910, M1934 and M1935, in 7.92 Mauser
 : M1910, M1920, M1921 and M1923 in 7.62×54mmR. The M1920 was designated as 7,62 pk/20. A few Madsens were used in the Finnish Civil War, and adopted in larger quantities by the army in 1926; retired and sold to Estonia in 1937 
 : Models 1915, 1919, 1922 and 1924 in 8mm Lebel
  French Morocco
 
 : Models of 1941 and 1942 in 7.92mm
 : Models of 1937 and 1939 in 7mm
 
 : M1950 in .30-06
 
 : Models of 1908, 1910, 1925 and 1930 in 6.5×52mm Carcano
 : Captured from the Dutch East Indies
: 3 pieces in stock of the Latvian Army by April 1936
 : Model of 1923 in 7.92mm
 : Models 1911 and 1934 in 7mm
 : Models of 1914 and 1918 in 6.5×55mm Swedish
 : Models of 1919, 1923, 1926, 1927, 1934, 1938 and 1939 in 6.5×53mmR.
 : M1947 in .303
 : M1916 in 7.65mm
 : M1929 in 7.65mm
 : Models of 1930, 1936 and 1952 in .303 and models of 1936, 1940 and 1947 in 7.92mm
 : Model 1904 and Model 1915 in 7.62×54mmR
 
 : M1907 and M1922 in 7mm
 
 : M1906, M1914 and M1921 in 6.5×55mm
 : Models of 1925, 1930, 1934, 1939, 1947 and 1949 in 8mm Siamese and Model 1951 in .30-06.
 : M1925, 1926, 1935 and 1937 in 7.92mm
 : Models of 1915, 1919, 1929, 1931 and 1939 in .303 British
  Colony of Natal: 27 Rexer machine guns were used during the Bambatha Rebellion
 : M1937 in 7mm
  various models in 7.92

See also
 Bren Gun
 FM-24/29
 Lahti-Saloranta M/26
 M1895 Colt-Browning machine gun
 ZB vz. 26
 Chauchat
 M1918 BAR

References
Citations

Bibliography

Further reading
 
  Семён Федосеев, "Российская карьера ружья-пулемёта «Мадсен»", Мастерружьё, 2010 issue 2 pp. 48–57, issue 3 pp. 58–64, and issue 6 pp. 42–51 (No. 155, 156 & 159). HTML version of the article: part 1, part 2, part 3

External links

 Deactivated Guns on the Madsen. Retrieved 20 April 2007
 Madsen Light Machine Gun. Retrieved 20 April 2007
 The Madsen Light Machine Gun on the Eastern and Western Front 1914–17. Retrieved 20 April 2007
 High resolution photo from Tøjhusmuseet, Copenhagen
 Forgotten Weapons – Madsen Semiauto LMG
 Animation showing the inner workings of the Madsen LMG

1902 establishments in Denmark
1955 disestablishments in Denmark
Light machine guns
Machine guns of Denmark
Firearms of Norway
Russo-Japanese war weapons of Japan
Russo-Japanese war weapons of Russia
World War I German infantry weapons
World War I machine guns
World War I Russian infantry weapons
World War II machine guns
World War II military equipment of Norway
8 mm machine guns
6.5×55mm machine guns